Raia is a surname. Notable people with the surname include:

Andrew Raia (born 1968), American politician
Cláudia Raia (born 1966), Brazilian actress
Joey Raia, American mix engineer
Margaret Raia (1929–2003), American actress
Moxie Raia, a.k.a. Laura Raia, (born 1990), American singer-songwriter
Silvano Raia, Brazilian surgeon